Colin Cunningham (born 15 September 1954) is an English former freestyle and backstroke swimmer.

Swimming career
He represented Great Britain at the 1972 Summer Olympics.  There he competed in the individual 100-metre and 200-metre backstroke. Cunningham was also a member of the relay teams in the 4×200-metre freestyle and 4×100-metre medley.

He represented England and won a silver medal in the 4 x 200 metres freestyle relay, a bronze medal in the 4 x 100 metres freestyle relay and another bronze medal in the 4 x 100 metres medley relay, at the 1974 British Commonwealth Games in Christchurch, New Zealand.

At the ASA National British Championships he won the 100 metres backstroke title twice (1972, 1973) and the 200 metres backstroke title twice (1972, 1973).

Coaching
Colin Cunningham was a swimming coach for Rotherham Metro ASC and was the clubs chief coach until 2005 when the council didn't want to support the swimming club. The club then decided to run it on their own through volunteers and now a new chief coach is in charge with Colin coaching "B" Squad, seniors and masters.

He is now currently head coach at Sheffield City Swimming Club as of January 2010.

See also
 City of Southampton Swimming Club
 List of Commonwealth Games medallists in swimming (men)

References

 British Olympic Association athlete profile
 

1954 births
Living people
English male swimmers
English male freestyle swimmers
Male backstroke swimmers
Olympic swimmers of Great Britain
Swimmers at the 1972 Summer Olympics
Swimmers at the 1974 British Commonwealth Games
Commonwealth Games silver medallists for England
Commonwealth Games bronze medallists for England
Place of birth missing (living people)
European Aquatics Championships medalists in swimming
Commonwealth Games medallists in swimming
Medallists at the 1974 British Commonwealth Games